This is a list of Spanish television related events in 1975.

Events 
 19 December: Gabriel Peña Aranda is appointed Director General of RTVE.
 TVE broadcasts 1.143 hours in colour versus 4.205 in Black and white.

Debuts

Television shows

La 1

Ending this year

La 1 
 Hoy también es fiesta (1970-1975) 
 Cuatro tiempos (1974-1975) 
 Fiesta (1974-1975) 
 Hoy 14,15 (1974-1975) 
 Las Instituciones (1974-1975) 
 ¿Le conoce usted? (1974-1975) 
 Lo de Tip y Coll (1974-1975) 
 Primera hora (1974-1975) 
 ¡Señoras y señores! (1974-1975) 
 Suspiros de España (1974-1975) 
 Tele-Revista (1974-1975) 
 Telecomedia (1974-1975)

Foreign series debuts in Spain

Births

See also
 1975 in Spain
 List of Spanish films of 1975

References 

1975 in Spanish television